The gas explosion on New Phetchaburi Road in Bangkok was a major disaster in Thailand. It took place on 24 September 1990, when a liquid petroleum gas tanker truck crashed on the expressway exit at New Phetchaburi Road, causing large explosions and fires that burned through 51 shop-houses for over 24 hours. 88 people died, 36 were injured and 67 cars were destroyed, making it one of the deadliest man-made disasters in Thailand. A 2002 horror film, The Eye, based its climactic scene on this incident.

See also
List of disasters in Thailand

References

Further reading

. Note that the link points directly to the map section.  Other contents on the page may contain graphic pictures of victims.

Gas explosions
1990 in Thailand
1990 industrial disasters
September 1990 events in Thailand
Explosions in Bangkok